Collège des Ingénieurs (also referred to as CDI) is a European educational institution and business school founded in Paris (France), Munich (Germany), and Torino (Italy). It provides Engineering graduates with learning opportunities in business administration and finance, in order for them to develop the key skills and competencies required to succeed in the corporate environment and to take up executive positions.

Established in 1986 and with a focus on value creation and entrepreneurship for scientists and engineers, the school currently grants an M.B.A. degree, and runs in partnership, a joint Ph.D. - M.B.A. degree program in "Sciences & Management" (first with Pierre and Marie Curie University, but now also with Paris-Sorbonne University, PSL Research University, University of Paris-Saclay, Karlsruhe Institute of Technology, Technical University of Munich...). Additionally, the school offers executive courses (Corporate Universities) and runs Copernic, a Master program in Management designed for Central and Eastern European graduates in cooperation with the French Ministry of Foreign Affairs, Grandes Ecoles and industry partners. Because of the international character of the programs, the official language of instruction is English; however, in the various national branches some lectures are occasionally given in French, German and Italian as well.

Entirely financed by supporting companies, the CDI is renowned within France and abroad for being highly selective, for its action learning approach and for its strong connections with industry: M.B.A. candidates are required to complete a project at one of the sponsor companies. All programs are tuition free. Past and current sponsor companies of the M.B.A. program include (but are not limited to): Airbus, Air Liquide, BMW, Daimler, Lufthansa, Pirelli, Infineon Technologies Areva, Fiat Chrysler Automobiles, Siemens, EDF, Engie, ERG, Eutelsat, Telecom Italia, Porsche, Juventus Football Club, Safran, Sanofi and Total.

History
The Collège was founded in 1986 by Philippe Mahrer, the Pre-founding advisory committee was headed by Jean Peyrelevade, members of the committee were among others, the Directors of leading French Grandes Ecoles (the Ecole Normale and the Ecole des Ponts et Chaussées), as well as business leaders. M.B.A. classes started in September of the same year. In 1990, the Copernic Program was started, in cooperation with the French Ministry for Foreign Affairs, Institut d'Études Politiques de Paris, Ecole des Mines de Paris and ENPC. In 1992 the Actuary Diploma program was created. Other programs soon followed: the M.S. program in Applied Mathematics for Insurance, in partnership with University of Marne la Vallée, was established in 1993, while the CDI-China program started in 1994.

Up to this point, all of the CDI activities had taken place in France; in 1996, however, alumnus Knut Stannowski opened the German branch in Stuttgart with support from the Baden-Württemberg Land. The international expansion of the CDI was subsequently furthered by the opening of an agency in St. Gallen, Switzerland, in 2003 and of an office in Munich in 2008.

In 2009, by initiative of John Elkann, Vice President of Fondazione Giovanni Agnelli, together with Marco Tronchetti Provera, President of Fondazione Pirelli, and Riccardo Garrone, President of Fondazione Edoardo Garrone, the Scuola di Alta Formazione al Management (SAFM) was established in Turin, Italy, based on the CDI model of action learning. The school currently runs the CDI-licensed M.B.A. program for Italian graduates, fully affiliated with the one offered at Collège des Ingénieurs, and its students take a number of classes together with their French and German counterparts.

Academics

M.B.A. Program
Collège des Ingénieurs runs an innovative ten-month M.B.A. program in Paris, Munich and Turin. The uniqueness of the CDI M.B.A., as compared to traditional Business Administration graduate degrees, lies in being entirely financed by sponsoring companies, with an emphasis on action learning. All admitted students, therefore, receive a fellowship which covers tuition fees and provides a stipend to cover basic living costs. Since the number of fellowships is limited, the program is renowned for being highly competitive. Furthermore, the program is also international in nature, as all students are required to take classes and sit exams in Italy, Germany, France and Switzerland as part of the program.

In turn, CDI Fellows are required to spend six months working on strategic projects at the sponsoring company; generally referred to as mission, this is an integral part of the M.B.A. experience as it provides Fellows with an opportunity to test their newly gained competencies in a real business environment. To enhance learning, weeks of lectures are alternated with periods of company work, and Fellows are required to submit monthly reports regarding their work at the companies.

The study curriculum includes classes in accounting, strategy, marketing, entrepreneurship, innovation management, operations, corporate finance, business ethics, investments, leadership and human resources management. Moreover, throughout the year several lectiones magistrales are usually given by CEOs and industry experts on topics related to management, innovation and entrepreneurship.

CDI Fellows
Admission to the CDI M.B.A. program is extremely competitive. The Paris branch alone, on average, receives more than 1500 applications every year. About 90 students are selected to become CDI Fellows and about 15 doctoral students are admitted to the program. As the school name suggests, Engineering graduates make up for the majority of the student body; throughout the years, however, graduates in mathematics, physics, natural sciences and economics have also been admitted. The selection process is based on personality and leadership capacities, as well as on excellent academic record in the engineering or scientific field (MSc, PhD level or equivalent). The admission process includes interviews.

CDI Fellows hail from a variety of countries, educational institutions and cultural backgrounds. Represented countries include France, Germany, Italy, Spain, the United Kingdom, Switzerland, Austria, the United States, Canada, China, South Korea, Japan and India.

In the past, CDI Fellows attended institutions such as:

 Ecole des Mines ParisTech
 École Polytechnique
 Ecole des Ponts Paristech
 CentraleSupélec
 École Normale Supérieure (rue d'Ulm)
 École normale supérieure de Lyon
 École normale supérieure Paris-Saclay
 École normale supérieure de Rennes
 AgroParisTech, ENGREF 
 Télécom ParisTech
 ESPCI ParisTech
 Politecnico di Milano
 Politecnico di Torino
 Università di Padova
 Università di Bologna
 Università di Pavia
 Scuola Superiore Sant’Anna di Pisa
 RWTH Aachen
 TU München
 Karlsruhe Institute of Technology
 TU Darmstadt
 TU Delft
 TU Dresden
 Universität Stuttgart
 Cambridge University
 Oxford University
 EPFL
 ETH Zurich
 Georgia Tech
 M.I.T.
 Harvard University
 University of California at Berkeley
 McGill University
In Germany, the CDI has formal co-operations with the Studienstiftung des deutschen Volkes and the Stiftung der deutschen Wirtschaft (SDW).

Notable graduates 

 Jacques Le Marois, co-founder of Mandriva and of GeneaNet
 Yves Caseau, executive vice president at Bouygues Telecom
 John de Souza, president and CEO of MedHelp, former vice president at Goldman Sachs and co-founder of Flash Communications, an early instant messaging system later bought by Microsoft
 Nathalie Kosciusko-Morizet, French Minister of State with responsibility for Forward Planning, Assessment of Public Policies and Development of the Digital Economy
 Jacques Veyrat, co-founder and former CEO of Neuf Cegetel
 Isabel Marey-Semper, head of shared services for R&D at L'Oréal and former vice president for strategy and innovation at PSA Peugeot Citroën
 Martha Crawford Heitzmann, vice president of research and development at AREVA
 Elisabeth Borne, prime minister of France since May 2022

Industry Connections
The CDI maintains a strong alumni network, which in turn results in an extensive network of industry connections, since many former students have taken up positions in their sponsoring companies after graduation. Companies with links to the Collège include, but are not limited to:

 Air Liquide
 Airbus
 Alcatel-Lucent
 Alenia
 Arcelor-Mittal
 Areva
 BMW
 Boston Consulting Group
 Bouygues
 Commissariat à l'énergie atomique (CEA)
 Daimler
 Edison
 EDF
 ERG
 Evonik
 FIAT Group
 General Electric
 Hilti
 Infineon Technologies
 KUKA
 Leonardo-Finmeccanica
 Lufthansa
 Johnson Controls
 La Stampa
 Magneti Marelli
 Michelin
 MTU
 Orange
 Pirelli
 Porsche
 Prysmian
 PSA Peugeot Citroën
 Renault
 Sanofi
 Siemens
 SNCF
 Telecom Italia
 Webasto

External links
Collège des Ingénieurs Website
Collège des Ingénieurs Italia Website

Education in Paris